Lucien Joseph Simon (1861 – 1945) was a French painter and teacher born in Paris.

Early life and education
Simon was born in Paris. After graduating from the Lycée Louis-le-Grand, he studied painting at the studio of Jules Didier, then from 1880 to 1883 at l’Académie Julian.

Career 
He exhibited at the Salon des Artistes Francais from 1891, and at the Salon de la Société Nationale des Beaux-Arts.

In 1891, he married the painter Jeanne Dauchez, the sister of André Dauchez (1870–1948), and became infatuated with the scenery and peasant life of her native Brittany.

In 1895, he met Charles Cottet and became a member of his Bande noire or "Nubians", along with Dauchez, René-Xavier Prinet, Edmond Aman-Jean and Émile-René Ménard, employing the principles of Impressionism but in darker tones.

He was one of the founding teachers at Martha Stettler and Alice Dannenberg's Académie de la Grande Chaumière in 1902. He also taught at the Académie Colarossi around the same time, as well as taking private students.

He taught at École Nationale des Beaux-Arts from 1923 and elected to its Académie des Beaux-Arts in 1929, a position he held for 13 years.

In 1937 he won First Prize at "l’Exposition universelle de Paris" for his work on the Luxembourg pavilion.

 (1892–1979), the son of Lucien and Jeanne (who was also a painter), was a noted animal sculptor.

A portrait of Lucien Simon, painted by Charles Cottet in 1907, hangs in the Musée d'Orsay in Paris.

He died in 1945 in Combrit. In 2002 there was an exhibition at the Galerie Philippe Heim in Paris devoted to the work of Paul, Lucien and Jeanne Simon.

Selected paintings

Notable students

Frank Armington

Patrick Bakker
Yves Brayer
A.M. Cassandre
Grace Evelyn Chapman (1888-1961)
William H. Clapp
Alice Dannenberg 
Bessie Davidson
Lucille Douglass
Jean Dries
Lucien Fontanarosa
Agnes Noyes Goodsir
Victor Higgins
 
Edwin Holgate
Yvonne Housser
Robert Humblot (1907-1962)
Henri Jannot (1909-2004)
Friederike Koch-Langentreu (1866-1941)
Lul Krag
Bernard Lamotte
Lowes Dalbiac Luard
Florence Helena McGillivray
Kay Nielsen
Pan Yuliang
Ambrose McCarthy Patterson
Alfred Pellan
Elenore Plaisted Abbott
Elena Popea
Steffi Reiner-Gartenberg (1885-1969)
Mary Rogers

Manuel Ros (1882-1961)
Amrita Sher-Gil

Boris Smirnoff
Martha Stettler 
Dorothy Stevens
Helena Sturtevant (1872-1946)
Mary Swanzy
Sydney Thompson
Marie Tuck
Anna Milo Upjohn
Martha Walter
John Weygandt (1869-1951)

References

19th-century French painters
French male painters
20th-century French painters
20th-century French male artists
1861 births
1945 deaths
Members of the Académie des beaux-arts
Academic staff of the Académie de la Grande Chaumière
Honorary Members of the Royal Academy
19th-century French male artists